Boris Becker defeated Goran Ivanišević in the final, 4–6, 6–4, 6–3, 7–6(7–4) to win the singles tennis title at the 1994 Stockholm Open.

Michael Stich was the defending champion, but lost in the quarterfinals to Becker.

Seeds

  Pete Sampras (semifinals)
  Goran Ivanišević (final)
  Michael Stich (quarterfinals)
  Sergi Bruguera (quarterfinals)
  Stefan Edberg (third round)
  Boris Becker (champion)
  Michael Chang (second round)
  Todd Martin (third round)
  Andre Agassi (quarterfinals)
  Wayne Ferreira (third round)
  Yevgeny Kafelnikov (semifinals)
  Andriy Medvedev (second round)
  Jim Courier (third round)
  Thomas Muster (second round)
  Marc Rosset (third round)
  Richard Krajicek (second round)

Draw

Finals

Top half

Section 1

Section 2

Bottom half

Section 3

Section 4

External links
 1994 Stockholm Open draw

Singles